Pink Hope is an Australian non-profit organisation founded by Krystal Barter for educating and preventing about hereditary breast and ovarian cancer.

Objectives
Ensure those at high risk are able to make informed decisions about their health and are supported throughout their journey
Changing the way high risk families gain the support and resources they need outside of the healthcare environment
To change the future for high risk families Australia wide
Create a global alliance with other similar charities around the world to share resources

References

Cancer organisations based in Australia